Zahrisht is a village in Kukës County, northeastern Albania. At the 2015 local government reform it became part of the municipality Has.

References

Populated places in Has (municipality)
Villages in Kukës County